Meeting on Southern Soil is an album by Norman Blake and Peter Ostroushko, released in 2002.

Reception

Writing for Allmusic, the music critic Chris Nickson wrote of the album, "Albums like this renew the roots of American music, bringing new blood (tunes and songs) into what is really a flowing river of history. To hear these two together is a sheer joy and a triumph of musical skill and love."

Track listing 
All songs Traditional unless otherwise noted.
"Blackberry Blossom" – 3:37
"Rise When the Rooster Crows	" – 3:14
"President Richard Milhous Nixon's Hornpipe" (Ostroushko) – 3:17
"Blake's Railroad Blues" (Blake) – 8:45
"Muddy Creek" – 2:59
"Little Bessie" –  6:03
"Chickamauga" (Ostroushko) – 4:03
"Only a Bunch of Violets" – 4:33
"Oklahoma Redbird" – 2:44
"I Cannot Call Her Mother" – 3:46
"Marjorie's Waltz #3" (Ostroushko) – 6:52
"The Old Hickory Cane" – 3:19
"Oh Death" – 4:53
"Mandolin Medley: Caperton Ferry/Ruins of Richmond/Valley Head" (Blake) – 4:58
"The Little Log Hut in the Lane" – 2:40
"Christmas Eve Is Coming, Anna" (Ostroushko) – 3:04

Personnel
Peter Ostroushko – guitar, mandolin, fiddle, mandola, vocals
Norman Blake – guitar, mandolin, vocals
Nancy Blake – cello

Production notes
Norman Blake – mixing
Peter Ostroushko – mixing
Jim Emrich – engineer
David Glasser – mastering
Carla Leighton – art direction, design
Billy Pierce – assistant engineer
Lane Brown Taylor – photography

References

2002 albums
Norman Blake (American musician) albums
Peter Ostroushko albums
Red House Records albums